Gabriel Christie may refer to:

Gabriel Christie (British Army officer) (1722–1799), British Army general from Montreal, Canada
Gabriel Christie (Maryland politician) (1756–1808), U.S. Congressman from Maryland

See also
 Christie (name)